The Iowa Green Party is  the Iowa-affiliate of the Green Party of the United States (GPUS). The 2013 Annual Meeting of the GPUS was held at the Iowa Memorial Union in Iowa City, Iowa.

Candidates
The 2016 nominee for President of the United States was Jill Stein.
In 2000, Ralph Nader was on the presidential ballot of the Iowa Green Party and received over 2% of the vote, qualifying the party for ballot access. Two years later, Jay Robinson ran as the Green Party nominee for Governor and received 1.43% and the party lost ballot access. In 2004, neither statewide candidate (David Cobb for President nor Daryl A. Northrop for U.S. Senate) received the minimum 2% of the vote. In 2006, Wendy Barth, a software developer and peace activist, ran for Governor as the Iowa Green Party nominee. She finished in third place of five ballot qualified candidates with .75% of the vote. Barth ran two years later for Iowa's second congressional district, again finishing third. She gained 2.18% of the vote.

National Green Party nominees for President Ralph Nader (2000), David Cobb (2004), Cynthia McKinney (2008) and Jill Stein (2012 and 2016) have all appeared on the ballot.

Related

List of State Green Parties
 Iowa Libertarian Party
 Political party strength in Iowa
 Politics of Iowa
 Government of Iowa
 Elections in Iowa
 List of politics by U.S. state

References

External links
 

Iowa
Political parties in Iowa